The David Orlowsky Trio (previously: Klezmorim or David Orlowsky's Klezmorim) was a German music ensemble founded in 1997 and disbanded in 2019.

History 
The founding members of the Trio included the clarinettist , the double bassist  and the guitarist . Jo Ambros was succeeded by Frank Wekenmann (* 1968) from 2003 to 2005; from 2005 Jens-Uwe Popp (* 1967) took over the guitarist position in the trio.

In the beginning, the ensemble played traditional klezmer music. Today, the repertoire consists mainly of original compositions with influences from klezmer, jazz, Arabic music and chamber music.

The trio's compositions are published in 5 music books by Advance Music / Schott-Verlag. und beim Self-publishing Verlag Bookmundo.

Since 1999, the trio has released ten CDs seven of them on Sony classical. In 2008, they changed their name to David Orlowsky Trio.

Concert tours have taken the trio to America, Asia, Europe; they have performed at the Concertgebouw Amsterdam, Carnegie Hall New York and the Berlin Philharmonie. The ensemble has performed at the Schleswig-Holstein Music Festival, the Ludwigsburger Schlossfestspiele, the Rheingau Musik Festival, the Lucerne Festival, the Beethovenfest Bonn and the Walkenrieder Kreuzgangkonzerte.

In 2019, the trio gave its farewell tour under the motto "Milestones - 20 years of David Orlowsky Trio".

Prizes and awards 
The ensemble was awarded the ECHO Klassik in the category "Classical Music without Borders" in 2008. In 2015, the trio again received the ECHO Klassik in this category.

Recording 
 2001 – Sedum (Way Out Records)
 2003 – Panta Rhei (Way Out Records)
 2004 – Lark (Way Out Records)
 2007 – Noema (Sony Classical)
 2008 – Nessiah (Sony Classical)
 2011 – Chronos (Sony Classical)
 2014 – Klezmer Kings - A Tribute (Sony Classical)
 2015 – Symphonic Klezmer (Sony Classical)
 2017 – Paris – Odessa (Sony Classical)
 2019 – One Last Night-Live at Elbphilharmonie Hamburg (Sony Classical)

References

External links 
 
 
 CD-Einspielungen
 

German world music groups
Klezmer groups
Echo (music award) winners
Musical groups established in 1997
Musical groups disestablished in 2019
1997 establishments in Germany
2019 disestablishments in Germany
German musical trios